Dagobert von Gerhardt (pen-name Gerhard von Amyntor; 12 July 1831 in Liegnitz, Silesia – now Legnica, Poland – 24 February 1910 in Potsdam) was a German soldier, poet, and novelist.

Biography
After attending the gymnasium at Glogau, he entered the Prussian army in Breslau, and advanced to the rank of major. He was severely wounded in the assault upon the fortifications of Düppel during the Danish War of 1864, and in 1867 he was employed by Moltke on the army's general staff at Berlin. He served in the Franco-German War of 1870-71.

Writings
His first literary attempt was a military work: Der Antagonismus Frankreichs und Englands vom politisch-militärischen Standpunkt (The antagonism between France and England from a political-military standpoint; Berlin, 1860). He was in his forties before he tried his hand at popular works, and first achieved notice with Peter Quidams Rheinfahrt (Peter Quidam's Rhine Journey; 1877). His numerous novels include:
 Hypochondrische Plaudereien (4th ed. 1875, new series; 3d ed. 1890)
 Randglossen zum Buch des Lebens (1876)
 Peter Quidams Rheinfahrt (Stuttgart, 1877)
 Der Zug des Todes (Elberfeld, 1878)
 Der neue Romanzero (2d ed. 1883)
 Eine moderne Abendgesellschaft, treating Jewish issues (3d ed. 1881)
 Gerke Suteminne (3d ed. 1890)
 Durch Nacht zum Licht (1887)
 Die Cis Moll Sonate (1891)
He wrote an autobiography, Skizzenbuch meines Lebens (Sketchbook of my life; Breslau, 1893–98, 2 vols.).

References

External links
 

1831 births
1910 deaths
19th-century German novelists
People from Legnica
People from the Province of Silesia
Prussian Army personnel
Prussian military personnel of the Second Schleswig War
German military personnel of the Franco-Prussian War
German male novelists
19th-century German male writers